Archie Walter Willis Jr. (March 16, 1925 - 1988) was a lawyer, businessman, and  state representative in Tennessee. He was the first African American elected to state office in Tennessee in more than 70 years. 

He was born in Birmingham, Alabama. He moved to Memphis in 1953 and helped establish the city's first integrated law firm. He represented James Meredith who was being blocked from attending the University of Mississippi in Oxford, Mississippi.

Part of Auction Avenue in downtown Memphis is named in his honor. The A. W. Willis Bridge is named for him. He was married to the educator and activist Miriam DeCosta-Willis from 1972 until his death in 1988.

See also
African Americans in Tennessee
African-American officeholders during and following the Reconstruction era

References

Members of the Tennessee House of Representatives

1925 births
1988 deaths